St Deiniol's Church, was a church in Criccieth, Gwynedd, Wales.  It was built between 1884 and 1887.

The church was designed by Douglas and Fordham, a Chester firm of architects.  Its plan was cruciform, consisting of a six-bay nave, a three-bay chancel with sanctuary, north and south transepts, and a south porch.  It had a short spire with low, broad, broaches.  A west tower was planned but never built.  The church closed in 1988, and it has been converted into residential flats.

See also
List of new churches by John Douglas

References
Citations

Sources

Criccieth, St Deiniol
Criccieth
Criccieth, St Deiniol's Church
Churches completed in 1887
Criccieth, St Deiniol
Criccieth